The Sioux Falls Jazz and Blues Festival (more commonly JazzFest) is an annual three-day outdoor musical event, featuring two stages and is free to the public. It is one of the largest free music festivals in its region and is held annually at Yankton Trail Park in Sioux Falls, South Dakota during the third weekend in July. In 2019, it was announced the festival would be cancelled for a need to be "refreshed and retooled."

The festival was created in 1991 by Chris Carlsen, Ann McDowell, Nettie Myers, Sharon Reynolds and Michael Turner.

References

External links

Festivals in South Dakota
Jazz festivals in the United States
Music of South Dakota
Culture of Sioux Falls, South Dakota
Tourist attractions in Sioux Falls, South Dakota
Performing arts in South Dakota